Avaada Energy is a green energy developer headquartered in Mumbai, India. It works on solar energy projects, including distributed solar energy production with business interests in Solar Module Manufacturing, Electrolyser manufacturing and Green Ammonia production. It is an integrated energy group with business interests in Solar Module Manufacturing, Electrolyser manufacturing and Green Ammonia production. Avaada has been backed by global finance majors like Asian Development Bank (ADB, Asia), DEG (Germany), FMO (Netherlands) and Proparco (France). In mid-2021, PTT Group of Thailand became a strategic investor in Avaada.

Background 
Avaada Energy, established in 2017, is a green energy company operating in India. It has commissioned renewable energy projects in 11 Indian states.

Avaada Group is now executing an integrated solar manufacturing plant with a facility to produce polysilicon, wafer, cells, and modules with a cumulative capacity of 10 GW by 2030. The plant's first phase consisting of cells and modules will be operational in 2023 and will cater to domestic and international markets.  Avaada Group is getting future-ready and has diversified in Green Hydrogen / Ammonia, targeting a cumulative capacity of 4 MTPA per annum by 2030 to cater to domestic and foreign markets. The group entered a new segment of business involving electrolyser manufacturing, where it will pursue a manufacturing capacity of 1 GW per annum.

In August 2022, Avaada signed a Memorandum of Understanding (MoU) with the Department of Industries and Commerce, Government of Rajasthan, India to set up a green ammonia facility and a renewable energy power plant in Kota, Rajasthan. According to the official press release, the MoU proposes an investment of Rs 40,000 crore while also providing direct employment opportunities to about 3,500 people and indirect jobs to over 10,500 people.

Avaada Group has also established an off-grid project in Jayapur, Gurajat has enabled the village to be India's first village to be adopted by the Indian Prime Minister, Narendra Modi

People
 Vineet Mittal: Chairman
 Sindoor Mittal: Vice Chairperson
 Kishor Nair: Chief Operating Officer

Equity partners
Avaada Energy has an equity partner, the PTT Group from Thailand. Before that, the organization was backed by different investors, including Asian Development Bank (ADB), DEG, FMO & Proparco.

Green Bonds
In 2022 Avaada raised green bonds for $192 million in the Indian capital market at 6.75% making it India's largest AAA-rated Green Bond by any renewable energy developer.

Products and services
Avaada provides Engineering, Procurement & Construction (EPC) services. It holds expertise in Open Access Solar Projects, Utility Solar Projects, Rooftop Solar Projects, Integrated Solar Panel Manufacturing, Green Hydrogen production and Electrolyser Manufacturing.

Avaada Foundation
Avaada Foundation, the philanthropic arm of the Avaada Group of companies, is engaged in social welfare activities—with a significant focus on child education, medical facilities in rural areas, skill development, women empowerment, and so on. It has also spearheaded various projects in initiatives ranging from the distribution of essential supplies to marginalised communities during Covid-19 to setting up COVID Care Centers. The initiatives of Avaada foundation and their impact have also been a subject of a case study featured in the book Performance Management: Happiness and Keeping Pace with Technology.

Avaada Foundation inaugurated the COVID Care Centre with a capacity of 30 Beds in Kolayat, Bikaner in May 2021.

See also
 Solar Energy Corporation of India
 Solar power in India

References

External links
 
 World Economic Forum - Welspun Energy (Now Avaada Group)
 Economic Times - Avaada
 Economic Times - Avaada Energy
 / Investor Summit 2018

Companies based in Mumbai
Renewable energy companies of India
Energy companies established in 2017
Solar energy companies of India
Engineering companies of India
Indian brands